The Olomouc tramway network is a standard-gauge tram system located in Olomouc, Czech Republic. It is operated by Dopravní podnik města Olomouce a.s., a company owned by the city of Olomouc. As of 2022, DPMO had a total of 66 tram vehicles designed for regular passenger transport.

History

Beginning
Olomouc was served by horse buses since 1845. Work began on a standard-gauge electric tram in 1897 and the first line opened to public on 1 April 1899.

Early 20th century
In 1904, the city terminated contracts with private operators and took over tram lines. There were no changes in the scope of the network. Work on all unfinished track was immediately stopped (with the exception of the track to the new cemetery in Neředín, opened on 3 October 1914) due to World War I. After the proclamation of the republic four years later, modernization was required. In 1923, lines received numerical designations. In the 1930s, the line from Neředín to the military airport became the first (and so far the only) tram line to an airport in the whole of Czechoslovakia.

Late 20th century
The track to the military airport was deemed unnecessary and was decommissioned in 1953. With it, a loop was created in Neředín. In 1957, an extension on the line to Pavlovičky was put into operation.

Between 1947 and 1967, a large number of older cars were purchased from Prague. In 1957, the first PCC trams were delivered - ten Tatra T1 cars. In the early 1960s, five Tatra T2 trams also appeared in Olomouc. However, the significant renewal of the fleet began only with the delivery of Tatra T3 vehicles in the second half of the 1960s.

As in other cities at the time, such as Ústí nad Labem or České Budějovice, there were proposals to decommission tram transport and replace it with buses, although this never happened. In 1981, a major reconstruction of the track took place on Nová street.

In the 1990s, new low-floor tram cars were added (Škoda 03T, also known as Astra). On 29 October 1998, a new zoning plan was adopted by the Olomouc City Council which reassured the future of trams as the backbone of the city transport. In 1999, the tram system in Olomouc celebrated its hundredth birthday.

Recent times
From 1 September 2007, line 5 which led from Pavlovičky around the main train station via Tržnice to Neředín was closed.

By the end of August 2007, a six-month reconstruction of Denisova and Pekařská streets in the city center was complete. The tram track bed was soundproofed using a rubber mat base and the track structure was also replaced. The total cost of the reconstruction amounted to CZK 105 million of which over CZK 30 million was spent on tram traction.

In June 2012, the construction of a new 1.4 km long line began, which lead from Šantovka, through Velkomoravská Street to the intersection of Rooseveltova and Trnkova Streets in the Nové Sady district. This first stage with three stops (Šantovka, V Kotlině and Trnkova) was put into operation on 29 November 2013. The operator purchased 14 new double-sided VarioLF plus/o wagons.

In March 2021, DPMO started the construction of the second stage of the line to Nové Sady.

Routes
In 2022, this was the list of routes:

Ticketing
Passengers must buy and validate a ticket immediately after boarding a vehicle, or before entering a metro station's paid area. There are uniformed and plainclothes fare inspectors who randomly check passengers' tickets within the paid area; they are equipped with an inspection badge or carrier ID. Olomouc operates ticketing under one single Zone 71. Adult tickets cost 18 CZK (as of 1 April 2020) for a 40-minute ride on a weekday, or a 60-minute ride on weekends. Reduced fare of 9 CZK applies to children up to 15 years of age. Transport is free for children under age of 6 accompanied by an adult, and for people aged 65 and over. SMS and electronic mobile phone tickets are also available.

Rolling stock
The following types of passenger tram cars run in Olomouc:

See also
 History of Olomouc
 List of tram and light rail transit systems
 List of town tramway systems in the Czech Republic

References

External links
 Olomouc Transport Authority

Olomouc
Olomouc
Olomouc